Jean-François Corminboeuf (born 4 February 1953) is a sailor from Switzerland, who represented his country at the 1980 Summer Olympics in Tallinn as helmsman in the Soling. With crew members Robert Perret and Roger-Claude Guignard they took the 7th place.

References

1953 births
Living people
Sailors at the 1980 Summer Olympics – Soling
Olympic sailors of Switzerland
Swiss male sailors (sport)
20th-century Swiss people